Benjamin Okechukwu Aghadiuno (born 30 January 2000) is an English footballer who most recently played for Barnet.

Career
Aghadiuno played for Wingate & Finchley and Boreham Wood at youth level, before joining Barnet in 2016. After loan spells at Hillingdon Borough and Northwood in 2016–17, in which he played one game each, scoring four goals in his only game for Hillingdon, a 12–0 win over Hadley Wood & Wingate on 7 January 2017, Aghadiuno made his debut for the Bees the following season as a 60th-minute substitute in an EFL Trophy game against Luton Town on 3 October 2017. He made his EFL debut on Saturday 25 November against Grimsby Town. In August 2018 he joined Haringey Borough on a work experience loan. A month later he joined Aylesbury United, also on work experience. Aghadiuno joined Hendon on loan on 19 January 2019, but made no appearances and joined Corinthian-Casuals on loan in February 2019. He was released by Barnet at the end of the 2018–19 season.

Career statistics

References

External links

2000 births
Living people
English footballers
Association football forwards
Wingate & Finchley F.C. players
Boreham Wood F.C. players
Barnet F.C. players
Hillingdon Borough F.C. players
Northwood F.C. players
Haringey Borough F.C. players
Aylesbury United F.C. players
Hendon F.C. players
Corinthian-Casuals F.C. players
English Football League players
Southern Football League players
Isthmian League players
Footballers from Enfield, London
Black British sportsmen